Karura Subregion is a subregion in the Northern Red Sea region (Zoba Semienawi Keyih Bahri) of Eritrea. Its capital is at Karura.

References

Subregions of Eritrea

Northern Red Sea Region
Subregions of Eritrea